Stigmella obliquella is a moth of the family Nepticulidae which feeds on willow (Salix species) and can be found in Asia and Europe. It was first described by Hermann von Heinemann in 1862.

Description
The wingspan is 4.6–6 mm. The head is orange, the collar yellow-white. Antennal eyecaps yellow-white. Forewings are coarse, dark brown basal to the yellowish cross fascia, apex black. Hindwings grey. Adults are on wing from April to May and again in August.

Life cycle

Eggs
Laid on either side of a leaf of one of the smooth-leaved willows in May–June or August–September.

Larva
The larva is amber-yellow with a brown head and has a faint chain of pear-shaped dark ventral spots.

The larvae feed on Salix alba, S. babylonica, Salix x sepulcralis 'Chrysocoma', Salix x fragilis, S. pentandra, S. triandra and S. viminalis. They mine the leaves of their host plant feeding inside a widening corridor. Its course is variable, but generally it contains several long nearly straight segments.

Pupa
Pupation takes place outside of the mine.

Distribution
It is found in all of Europe (except the Balkan Peninsula), east to eastern Russia and China.

References

External links

 Stigmella obliquella at UKMoths
 Swedish moths
 Plant Parasites of Europe
 Stigmella obliquella images at  Consortium for the Barcode of Life
 Nepticulidae from the Volga and Ural region

Nepticulidae
Leaf miners
Moths described in 1862
Moths of Asia
Moths of Europe
Taxa named by Hermann von Heinemann